The Guandu Bridge is a bridge in New Taipei, Taiwan. It spans over the Tamsui River and links Bali District and Tamsui District. The bridge is a 165 meters long through arch bridge designed by Tung-Yen Lin under T.Y. Lin International. It now carries the Provincial Highway 15.

History
Bridge construction started in April 1980 and was completed on 31 October 1983.

Transportation
The bridge is accessible within walking distance west of Guandu Station of Taipei Metro.

See also
Transportation in Taiwan
Danjiang Bridge

References

1983 establishments in Taiwan
Arch bridges in Taiwan
Bridges completed in 1983
Bridges in New Taipei
Bridges in Taipei